Du Jiangfeng (born June 1969) is a Chinese physicist, university administrator and politician, an academician of the Chinese Academy of Sciences, currently serving as president of Zhejiang University. 

He is a member of the Chinese Communist Party (CCP). He is an alternate member of the 20th Central Committee of the Chinese Communist Party.

Biography
Du was born in Wuxi, Jiangsu, in June 1969. He attended . He earned a bachelor's degree in 1990, a master's degree in 1997, and a doctor's degree in 2000, all from the University of Science and Technology of China.

After graduating in 1990, he stayed and taught at his alma mater. From 2005 to 2007, he was a researcher of Dortmund University in Germany. He was appointed as a "Changjiang Scholar" (or " Yangtze River Scholar") by the Ministry of Education of the People's Republic of China in 2008. He moved up the ranks to become deputy dean of its School of Physics in 2012 and vice president in April 2018.

On 28 December 2022, the Organization Department of the Chinese Communist Party appointed Du as president of Zhejiang University, a position at vice-ministerial level.

Honours and awards
 2012 State Natural Science Award (Second Class) for the research on quantum computing based on nuclear spin
 October 2015 Member of the Chinese Academy of Sciences (CAS)
 2019 Science and Technology Progress Award of the Ho Leung Ho Lee Foundation

References

1969 births
Living people
People from Wuxi
Scientists from Jiangsu
University of Science and Technology of China alumni
Academic staff of the University of Science and Technology of China
Chinese physicists
Members of the Chinese Academy of Sciences
People's Republic of China politicians from Jiangsu
Chinese Communist Party politicians from Jiangsu
Alternate members of the 20th Central Committee of the Chinese Communist Party
20th-century Chinese scientists
21st-century Chinese scientists